Mary Watson (born 31 May 1975) is a South African author. In 2006 she won the Caine Prize for African Writing and in 2014 was named on the Africa39 list of writers from sub-Saharan Africa aged under 40 with potential and talent to define trends in African literature.

Biography
Born in Cape Town, Watson completed her master's degree in creative writing under André Brink at the University of Cape Town. After receiving a second master's degree at the University of Bristol in 2003, she returned to Cape Town where she completed her PhD. She worked as a lecturer in Film Studies at the University of Cape Town between 2004 and 2008.

Watson has lived in Galway, Ireland, since 2009.

Career
Watson is the author of Moss, a collection of short stories published in 2004. In 2013, her novel The Cutting Room was published by Penguin South Africa. Her short stories have appeared in several anthologies.

In 2006, she won the Caine Prize for her short story "Jungfrau". She was a finalist in the Rolex Protege and Mentorship programme in 2012.

In April 2014, Watson was named in the Hay Festival's Africa39 project as one of 39 writers from sub-Saharan Africa aged under 40 with potential and talent to define trends in African literature.

Works
Moss, Kwela, Cape Town, 2004
The Cutting Room, Penguin, Johannesburg, 2013
The Wren Hunt, Bloomsbury, 2018
The Wickerlight, Bloomsbury, 2019
Blood to Poison, Bloomsbury, 2022

References

External links
 Donna Bryson, "South African Author Wins Caine Prize", CBS, 12 July 2006.

South African women short story writers
South African short story writers
Writers from Cape Town
University of Cape Town alumni
Alumni of the University of Bristol
Academic staff of the University of Cape Town
Living people
1975 births
Caine Prize winners
21st-century South African women writers
South African expatriates in Ireland
21st-century short story writers